Hopewell is an unincorporated community in Preston County, West Virginia, United States. It lies at an elevation of 1742 feet (531 m).

References

Unincorporated communities in Preston County, West Virginia
Unincorporated communities in West Virginia